The Cleanists is a short-form Australian comedy television and web series created by Tristram Baumber that premiered on 8 December 2013 on Showcase TV in the United Kingdom. The series follows four partners in a house-cleaning company as they face various crises and embark on surreal adventures.

Plot
Each five-minute episode of The Cleanists brings a new house to clean and a new and bizarre adventure for the characters to navigate. The dramatic centre of the show is everyman Gregg’s struggle to work with insane business partners Magda and Philip. The main emotional focus of the series is an ongoing love triangle between Philip, Gregg and Gregg’s long-time friend Libby.

Characters
 Gregg (James Chapman) – Long-suffering protagonist of the series. Gregg hates working with Magda and Philip, but his long-standing feelings for Libby mean he’s trapped working with The Cleanists as long as she is.
 Libby (Shanon Kulupach) – Sunny and good-natured 'girl next door' who becomes increasingly involved with Philip and doesn't seem to notice his eccentricities.
 Magda (Gabriella Stevens) – Believes herself to be the boss of The Cleanists, despite all evidence it’s an equal partnership. Magda is ambitious, focused and not above trapping her workmates in confined spaces if there’s a good business reason for doing so.
 Philip (Craig Lindeman) – Wildcard of the group and resident weirdo. Philip attempts to psychologically destroy his male co-worker, Gregg, and has designs on Libby.

Development

Concept and creation
The series is created by Tristram Baumber and was developed out of an early pilot called Ultra Clean. Baumber penned the ten scripts and then held auditions in Newcastle, New South Wales to find the actors who would bring his characters to life.

Production
The ten episodes of the first season were filmed in and around Newcastle in June 2013. The cast and crew worked long days and were able to shoot at a rate of two episodes per day. Baumber, who directed all ten episodes, said of the shoot " It all came down to planning the schedules meticulously in advance. We overran our schedules slightly every day, but at least that meant finishing by 6pm, rather than 11pm."

Cast
The four main cast members appear in every episode of The Cleanists. The first season features guest appearances from Anne Rzechowicz as a tax officer, Peter Oliver as an annoying client, Corinne Lavis as a government safety inspector, Owen Sparnon and Diley Alanca as homicide detectives and Duncan Gordon as a mysterious "ghoulish figure".

Episodes

Season 1 (2013)

Season 2 (2014)

Release and reception

Online distribution
All ten episodes of The Cleanists season 1 debuted on the official Cleanists Channel on YouTube on 3 December 2013. The series was made available globally, with no regional lockout. The crowdfunded Season 2 debuted on YouTube on 14 December 2014.

Television broadcast
The first season of The Cleanists premiered on 8 December 2013 on UK broadcaster Showcase TV. Creator Baumber said of the broadcast "Getting the green light from Showcase TV in the UK was huge for us. We’re very excited about people across Great Britain and Ireland seeing our show. It just goes to demonstrate how truly global the TV business is now." The entire first season was aired in compendium form by Showcase, with repeat broadcasts following. The second season began airing in early 2015, following the same format.

Critical reception
The Cleanists was web TV aggregator SideReel's "Featured Series" in December 2013. SideReel's Leah Friedman said of the series "Think It’s Always Sunny crossed with the sweetness of Flight of the Conchords, but with Australian accents." Sam Gutelle from Tubefilter said "By the second episode, multiple plots twist out of each house visit, with ten installments representing the series’ complete run. Ultimately, there are few web comedies of higher quality; The Cleanists‘ execution is fittingly tidy."

Splitsider's Luke Kelly-Clyne gave the show a positive review, saying "Creating a series concept that’s repeatable, low-cost, and interesting is like solving a complex math equation. Baumber Good Will Hunting’d the shit out of this web chalkboard." Snobby Robot's Chris Hadley was similarly positive: "In addition to the hilarious stories in each episode, THE CLEANISTS features great characters that will also keep viewers coming back for more; characters that viewers will get to know and understand as each episode progresses."

References

External links
 
 

2013 Australian television series debuts
2014 Australian television series endings
Australian television sitcoms
Australian comedy web series
2013 web series debuts
2010s YouTube series
English-language television shows
Australian workplace comedy television series
2014 web series endings
YouTube channels launched in 2013